Future News was a 24-hour news channel in Lebanon, covering local and international news. It was a sister channel of Future Television. Its motto was "Right to know".  

Future News broadcast from Hamra, Beirut with its studios located on Kantari street.

History
Future News was launched on December 9, 2007 under the previous leadership of CEO Dr. Nadim Munla, then by Tarek Ayntrazi. Nadim Munla led Saad Hariri's team of economic advisors, in the 1990s with the late Prime Minister Rafic Hariri. It provided news to expatriate Lebanese.

The channel shut down on 20 August 2012.

External links

Future Television Official Site

2007 establishments in Lebanon
Television channels and stations established in 2007
Television channels and stations disestablished in 2012
Mass media in Beirut
24-hour television news channels
Television stations in Lebanon
Arab mass media
Arabic-language television stations